Thorpes was an English bus operator. It operated services under contract to Transport for London.

History

Thorpes was a coach operator that diversified into operating bus services under contract to Transport for London in the 1990s. Their Stationlink routes connected London termini using disabled access vehicles, terminating in Paddington. They also started operating mobility routes.

In October 2001 it purchased the business of London Traveller.

In August 2004, the business was purchased by ComfortDelGro. In January 2007, ComfortDelGro integrated Thorpes into its Metroline subsidiary.

Routes operated included 70, 143, 187, 210, 316, 326, 487, 705, 981, C11, H12 (school journeys), and SL2.

References

External links
Showbus gallery

2007 disestablishments in England

Former London bus operators